War Department Report is a 1943 American documentary film directed by Carl Marzani.  It was nominated for an Academy Award for Best Documentary Feature.

The film's primary intended audience was war workers; it consisted of "battle footage, analysis of Axis military and industrial strength, and pep talks about America's superior resources." Some of the footage came from John Ford's Field Photo section of the Office of Strategic Services.

The Academy Film Archive preserved War Department Report in 2012. The film is part of the Academy War Film Collection, one of the largest collections of World War II era short films held outside government archives.

References

External links
, posted by the San Diego Air & Space Museum

1943 films
American documentary films
American World War II propaganda films
American black-and-white films
1943 documentary films
1940s English-language films